Since the early twentieth century there is a significant overlap between Christian fundamentalism and millennialism in the United States and belief in false conspiracy theories such as those in Pat Robertson's 1991 book, The New World Order. Ed Stetzer wrote that Christians should repent of spreading false conspiracy theories and fake news online, which he says "directly violates Scripture’s prohibition from bearing false witness against our neighbors". He argued that "The Seth Rich conspiracy theory is a textbook example of false witness... Without seriously defending their claims, conservative Christians across the country accused their neighbor of murder."

See also
Blood libel

References

Sources

Further reading

Christian fundamentalism
Conspiracy theories
Christian fundamentalism